The Ford House in Owenton, Kentucky was located at 311 S. Main St.  It was built in 1870.  It was listed on the National Register of Historic Places in 1984.

It was a Greek Revival-style house with a two-story pedimented portico with double square columns.  It was built by Frank Ford out of yellow poplar cut on the premises to replace the previous house, which was burned in the American Civil War.

The building was destroyed sometime around 2010 and a Dollar General Store now resides on the site.

References

Houses on the National Register of Historic Places in Kentucky
Greek Revival architecture in Kentucky
Houses completed in 1870
National Register of Historic Places in Owen County, Kentucky
1870 establishments in Kentucky